Hysa is an Albanian surname. Notable people with the surname include:

Shefki Hysa (born 1957), Albanian writer and journalist
Tringa Hysa (born 1996), Albanian ballet dancer
Vilfor Hysa (born 1989), Albanian footballer
Ylber Hysa, Kosovar politician

See also

HYSA (high yield savings account), a type of savings account

Albanian-language surnames